5/6 may refer to:
May 6 (month-day date notation)
June 5 (day-month date notation)
The Qatar diplomatic crisis, which began on 5 June 2017
5 shillings and 6 pence in UK predecimal currency